Brice Lauriche Samba (born 25 April 1994) is a professional footballer who plays as a goalkeeper for Ligue 1 club Lens. Born in the Republic of the Congo, he represents France at international level.

Club career

Le Havre
Samba joined Le Havre in 2006, working his way through their youth team's before appearing in the first-team in 2011.

Marseille

On 4 January 2013, Samba joined Marseille from Le Havre, signing a four-and-a-half year contract. He made his professional debut for Marseille on 5 January 2014 in a Coupe de France game against Reims keeping a clean sheet in a 2–0 home win. On 9 July 2015, Samba joined Nancy on a season-long loan.

Caen
Samba joined Caen on a four-year deal from Marseille on 30 June 2017.

Nottingham Forest
On 7 August 2019, Samba joined EFL Championship side Nottingham Forest on a four-year deal for an undisclosed fee. He was initially brought in as a backup for on loan goalkeeper Arijanet Muric, but earned his place as Forest's number one after Muric made a number of costly mistakes.

Samba made his debut for Forest on 13 August 2019 in a 1–0 EFL Cup victory over Fleetwood Town. His league debut came on 24 August 2019 in a 2–1 win against Fulham. His impressive performances led him being named the Championship Fans' Player of the Month for November 2019. On 8 September 2020, Samba was included in the PFA Championship Team of the Year for the 2019–20 season.

In the 2022 Championship play-off semi-final, Samba saved three penalties to send Forest through to the final against Huddersfield Town. He subsequently started in the 2022 EFL Championship play-off final before being substituted for Ethan Horvath in the 89th minute with a groin injury as Forest held on to a 1–0 lead to confirm their return to the Premier League for first time in 23 years.

Lens
On 5 July 2022, it was announced that Samba had signed a five-year contract with Ligue 1 club Lens for an undisclosed fee. In the first half of the 2022–23 Ligue 1 season, he had 9 clean sheets out of 19 games.

International career
Born in the Republic of the Congo, Samba also holds both Congolese and French citizenship.

In March 2023, he received his first call-up to the France senior national team for the UEFA Euro 2024 qualifying matches against the Netherlands and the Republic of Ireland.

Career statistics

Club

Honours
Nottingham Forest
EFL Championship play-offs: 2022

Individual
PFA Championship Fans Player of the Month November 2019
PFA Team of the Year: 2019–20 EFL Championship

References

External links

 Brice Samba at Eurosport
 
 
 

1994 births
Living people
People from Pool Department
French footballers
Republic of the Congo footballers
Republic of the Congo emigrants to France
Association football goalkeepers
Olympique de Marseille players
AS Nancy Lorraine players
Stade Malherbe Caen players
Nottingham Forest F.C. players
RC Lens players
Ligue 1 players
Ligue 2 players
Championnat National 2 players
Championnat National 3 players
English Football League players
Expatriate footballers in England